Many Tanks Mr. Atkins is a 1938 British comedy war film directed by Roy William Neill and starring Claude Hulbert, Reginald Purdell and Barbara Greene.

It was made as a quota quickie by Warner Brothers at the company's Teddington Studios in London.
The film's sets were designed by the art director Peter Proud.

Plot summary
The troublesome Private Nutter is posted from regiment to regiment.

Cast
 Claude Hulbert as Claude Fishlock
 Reginald Purdell as Pete Nutter
 Barbara Greene as Rosemary Edghill
 Davy Burnaby as Lord Fishlock
 Frederick Burtwell as Colonel Edghill
 Jack Melford as Captain Torrent
 Arthur Hambling as Sergeant Major Hornett
 Edward Lexy as Sergeant Butterworth
 Edmund Breon as Colonel
 Ralph Truman as Zanner
 Dorothy Seacombe as Mrs Hornett

References

Bibliography
 Chibnall, Steve. Quota Quickies: The Birth of the British 'B' Film. British Film Institute, 2007.

External links

1938 films
1930s war comedy films
British war comedy films
Films directed by Roy William Neill
British black-and-white films
1938 comedy films
Films shot at Teddington Studios
Warner Bros. films
Quota quickies
1930s English-language films
1930s British films